Antoine Grauss (born August 3, 1984) is a French professional football player. Currently, he plays in the Ligue 2 for LB Châteauroux.

See also
Football in France
List of football clubs in France

References

External links

1983 births
Living people
French footballers
Ligue 2 players
Clermont Foot players
LB Châteauroux players
Association football midfielders